Kannetty is a village situating in the outskirts of Karunagappally, Kollam district, Kerala state , India. Kannetty is famous for the Vallam kalis conducted in the backwater of the same name.

Geography

The main geographic feature of this place is the backwater named Kannetty kayal. It is linked to National Waterway 3 by feeder canal. Several Vallam kalis are conducting in this backwater.

Vallam kali

Several Vallam kalis including Sree Narayana trophy vallamkali, Ayyankali trophy vallam kali, etc are conducting in the Kannetty-kayal.

Sree Narayana Trophy Vallam kali

Sree Narayana Trophy Vallamkali is one of the main Vallam kali in Kerala is conducting annually on Chathayam day of Onam.

Ayyankali Trophy vallam kali

This vallam kali is conducting as a memorial of Ayyankali, a social reformer in Kerala.

Politics

Kannetty is a part of  chavara legislative assembly and Kollam (Lok sabha constituency). Currently N.K Premachandran is serving as the Member of parliament of Kollam.

Demographics

Malayalam is the native language of Parakode.

See also
Vallam Kali
Kerala backwaters
Astamudi lake

References

Villages in Kollam district